Elena Yuryevna Kruchinkina (born 28 March 1995) is a Belarusian biathlete. She has competed in the Biathlon World Cup since 2018.

References

External links

1995 births
Living people
Belarusian female biathletes
Biathletes at the 2022 Winter Olympics
Olympic biathletes of Belarus
Belarusian people of Russian descent
Sportspeople from Mordovia